Ah! Les belles bacchantes , is a French comedy film from 1954, directed by Jean Loubignac, written by Francis Blanche, starring Robert Dhéry and Louis de Funès. The film is also known under the titles: Femmes de Paris and Peek-a-boo (USA).

Plot 

Robert Dhéry, director of the theatre 'Folies-Méricourt' advertises his latest show entitled Ah! These beautiful Women. Police inspector Michel Leboeuf, intrigued and alarmed by bold posters, decides to investigate.

Cast 
 Robert Dhéry : Robert Dhéry / The man playing cello
 Louis de Funès : Michel Lebœuf, the police inspector
 Colette Brosset : herself, as a dancer
 Raymond Bussières : the plumber
 Rosine Luguet : Rosine
 Roger Caccia :  
 Jacqueline Maillan : herself, as the director of Folies Méricourt
 Francis Blanche : Garibaldo Trouchet
 Jacques Jouanneau : Joseph Delmar
 Jacques Legras : a monk
 Roger Saget : a monk
 Robert Destain : Olaf Destain, singing "Rêverie militaire"
 Guy Pierrault : a musician (uncredited)
 Michel Serrault : a musician
 Marthe Serres : Marthe Serres, pianist

References

External links 
 
 Ah! Les belles bacchantes (1954) at the Films de France

1954 films
French comedy films
1950s French-language films
French black-and-white films
Films directed by Jean Loubignac
Films scored by Gérard Calvi
1954 comedy films
1950s French films